Moses Otolorin ( – 22 December 2014) was a Nigerian footballer. He played for IICC Shooting Stars of Ibadan in the Nigeria Premier League. He was a member of the squad that won the African Cup Winners' Cup in 1976. Otolorin died of cancer on 22 December 2014. He was 67.

References

1940s births
2014 deaths
Nigerian footballers
Shooting Stars S.C. players
People from Ilorin
Association football midfielders
Association football defenders